Quah Chin Lai (Kwa Chin Lai, Khua Chin Lai,  (26 November 1892 – 23 December 1990)) was a Singapore metal and machinery hardware tycoon and philanthropist.

Early life 
Quah was born in Fujian, China in 1892. When young, Quah would travel all over his township and neighboring counties to sell toys and wares. His interest in metal ware started when he was an apprentice for a blacksmith and made a career and business in blacksmithing.

Business and career 
In 1916, Quah travel to Singapore and founded Hiap Leong Kee which specialised in hardware construction equipment. During the Second World War, Hiap Leong Kee was seized by the Japanese and Quah escaped to Malaysia and hid in the plantations. After the Japanese surrendered, Quah resumed Hiap Leong Kee and imported European and American products. Within a few years, Hiap Leong Kee was reestablished as a leading company by Quah

.In 1947 his company could supply complete range of building machinery, equipments and shipping parts.
 Construction and building of Nanyang University in 1955.
 Founded the Nanyang Kuah Si Association in Singapore in 1954.
 Pioneer founders of the Singapore Metal & Machinery Association in 1935.
 Singapore Chinese Chamber of Commerce representing a  member of the Singapore Trade Mission Delegation to China in 1956
 Honorary member of Ee Hoe Hean
 Honorary member of Goh Loo Club 
 Honorary member of Singapore Hokkien Huay Kuan
 Honorary member of Singapore Ann Kway Association 
 Director of United Overseas Bank

Family
 Quah married Ms. Wen Ke Niang in the year 1901, in China and together they have 6 sons and 3 daughters. 
 In the year 1928, Quah married Yeo Peck Gim in Singapore as his second wife and together they have 2 sons and 4 daughters.

Legacy 
In recognition of Quah's contributions to society he was commemorated as follows:
 In 2012, Quah Chin Lai was listed as among the Prominent Figures of the World Fujian Communities publication recounts the lives of some 150 Hokkien Singaporeans and records their achievements and contributions to Singapore over the past 200 years. It will be launched in November this year.
 In 2015, World Scientific published a book about "Tan Lark Sye: Advocator And Founder Of Nanyang University" for Quah was mention for his contribution to Nanyang University.
 In 1999 in the book that documents Beihong in Southeast Asia (悲鸿在星洲), Quah was mention for his heroic effort rescuing Xu Beihong when the Japanese Empire invaded Singapore.

Gallery

References 

1892 births
1990 deaths
20th-century philanthropists
19th-century Singaporean people
 
Hokkien
people of Hokkien descent
Chinese emigrants to British Malaya
People from Fujian
People from Quanzhou
Businesspeople from Fujian
Hokkien businesspeople
Singaporean investors
Singaporean people of World War II
Singaporean philanthropists